James Moffat (1775 – 1815) was a Scottish engraver who worked in India during the rule of the East Indian Company.

Life
He was an ethnic Scotsman but he spent most of his life in India. He had a son named John Moffat who worked as a photographer.

Career
He arrived in Calcutta in 1789 and worked as an engraver there.

He joined the Calcutta Gazette in 1797.

Legacy
His engravings provided a clear picture of street life in Indian cities during the British colonial rule. His engravings have been auctioned by Christie's and are currently preserved in European libraries.

References

External links
 British Library
 Wikimedia Commons
 Christie's

1775 births
1815 deaths
Scottish artists